Matt Marshall (born March 22, 1985) is an American professional golfer from Carlton, Oregon.
 
He made the cut at the 2016 U.S. Open. He qualified for the Open by way of a playoff in sectional qualifying. This was his first U.S. Open.

Prior to his U.S. Open qualification, he played seven years on PGA Tour Canada where his best finish was second place at the 2012 ATB Financial Classic.

Marshall is a graduate of the University of California, Davis.

Results in major championships

"T" = tied
Note: Marshall only played in the U.S. Open.

References

External links

American male golfers
Golfers from Nevada
University of California, Davis alumni
Sportspeople from Reno, Nevada
People from Carlton, Oregon
1985 births
Living people